André Busch (14 March 1913 - 7 July 1991) was a French male water polo player. He was a member of the France men's national water polo team. He competed with the team at the 1936 Summer Olympics finishing in fourth place. On club level he played for FC Lyon (then, Cercle des Nageurs de Lyon).

References

External links
 

1913 births
1991 deaths
French male water polo players
Water polo players at the 1936 Summer Olympics
Olympic water polo players of France
Place of birth missing
Place of death missing